M&P Bodyguard may refer to either of two handguns:

 Smith & Wesson M&P Bodyguard 38, a revolver
 Smith & Wesson M&P Bodyguard 380, a semi-automatic pistol